Yankovic is an Anglicized version of the South Slavic surname Janković (Јанковић), or perhaps the Polish surname Jankowicz, derived from the given name Janko. Its bearers can be of different South Slav origins.

Notable people with the surname include:
"Weird Al" Yankovic (born 1959), American parodist
Frankie Yankovic (1915–1998), American accordionist

See also 
 Janković 
 Jankovich (disambiguation)